Benedicte Maurseth (born 7 February 1983) is a Norwegian traditional folk singer and musician.

Career 
Maurseth picked up the fiddle at the age seven, and studied with Knut Hamre. In addition to studies at the University of Bergen (minor in art history) she attended the Ole Bull Academy at Voss in the period 2004–06. She immersed herself in the baroque instrument viola d'amore next to her main instrument Hardanger fiddle. Maurseth is also a kveder and currently works as a freelance musician based in Bergen. Since 2005 she has had extensive concert activities nationally and internationally (including in USA, Canada, India, Tyskland, Belgia and in Island), both as a solo artist and in collaborations. In Germany she played at TFF Rudolstadt in 2010 and at the 'folkBALTICA' 2011.

Together with Knut Hamre, Nils Økland and Sigbjørn Apeland, Maurseth released the album Rosa I Botnen in 2006, a production with traditional music from Hardanger, performed on fiddles from the 1600s and 1700s. This is the oldest Hardanger fiddles that are preserved, and was recorded for the first time. In 2008, Maurseth together with Berit Opheim, Åsne Valland Norli and Kristin Skaare, released the album Fodnes, which was based on folk music from Hardanger collected by Geirr Tveitt. In 2009 she composed new music for a theater version of Jon Fosse lyrics, Andvake, and she performed on stage together with actor Svein Tindberg. Her music from this underlie the first solo record Alde (2010). She has also on several occasions acted together with Jon Fosse himself. Together with Gabriel Fliflet, Stein Urheim, Kristoffer Voght and Per Jørgensen she released the album Åresong in 2011, performing lyrics by Jon Fosse. Åresong was a commissioned works at the Bergen International Festival in 2010.

Honours 
2007: Young Folk Musician of the Year in Norway

Bibliography 
2014: Å vera ingenting – Samtalar med spelemannen Knut Hamre, Samlaget, preface by Jon Fosse

Discography

Solo albums 
2010: Alde (Heilo Records)
2019: Benedicte Maurseth (Heilo Records)
2022: Hárr (Hubro)

Collaborations 
With Knut Hamre
2006: Rosa I Botnen (Heilo Records)
2012: Anima (Heilo Records)

With Åsne Valland Nordli, Berit Opheim & Kristin Skaare
2008: Fodne Ho Svara Stilt (Heilo Records)

Duo with Åsne Valland Nordli
2014: Over Tones (ECM Records)

References

External links 

Benedicte Maurset Website Berlin mai 2011
Portrait on the TFF Rudolstadt page
folkBALTICA website

21st-century Norwegian violinists
21st-century Norwegian singers
Norwegian folk singers
ECM Records artists
Heilo Music artists
Norwegian folk musicians
Musicians from Eidfjord
1983 births
Living people
21st-century Norwegian women singers
21st-century violinists